Norman Washington "Junior" Giscombe (born 6 June 1957) is an English singer-songwriter often known as Junior who was one of the first British R&B artists to be successful in the United States. He is best known for his 1982 hit single, "Mama Used to Say".

Career
Giscombe was born in Wandsworth, London, England, and was a backing vocalist with Linx between 1980 and 1982.

When turning towards a solo career, he was first billed simply as Junior.  He scored a No. 7 hit in the UK Singles Chart in 1982, with "Mama Used to Say". His follow-up single, "Too Late" also made the top 20 in the UK. "Mama Used to Say" was also a top 40 Pop and top 5 R&B hit in the United States, earning him a "Best Newcomer" award from Billboard magazine.

Sometime (most likely) around 1984 and 1985, Giscombe recorded (and very possibly co-wrote) an unknown number of songs with Phil Lynott, the former leader, vocalist and bass player of hard rock band Thin Lizzy. Lynott died in January 1986 and the songs were never officially released. Most remain as demos, but one of the songs, "Lady Loves to Dance", was mastered and nearly released before being pulled by the record company. Some of the songs are available on YouTube, including "What's the Matter Baby" (Giscombe provides backing vocals) and "Time (and Again)" (Giscombe shares vocals with Lynott).

After a period outside the charts, he made a brief return to the top 10 in 1987 when he sang a duet with Kim Wilde on "Another Step (Closer to You)". He also became involved with the formation of Red Wedge in 1986 with Billy Bragg, Jimmy Somerville and Paul Weller, and had been a part of the Council Collective with the Style Council, Jimmy Ruffin and others for the 1984 fundraising single, "Soul Deep". In 1992, Junior appeared on stage at the 1992 Labour rally in Sheffield singing Curtis Mayfield's "Move On Up". Later, Giscombe became better known as a songwriter for artists such as Sheena Easton.

In 2014, Giscombe formed "The British Collective" with fellow British artists Don-E, Noel McKoy and Omar.

Personal life
Junior Giscombe was raised as the youngest of eight children.

He met his childhood sweetheart Nardia when he was 19 and she was 17 and remained together until her death. At the age of 24, Nardia was diagnosed with multiple sclerosis and died of complications from the condition in 2008 aged 50. Junior and Nardia had two children. Their second child, Jenique, was also diagnosed with multiple sclerosis in 2008 (six months before her mother's death) and she died in May 2017. Giscombe dedicated his 2020 album "Everyting Set" to his daughter's memory.

Giscombe is the uncle of British comedian Richard Blackwood, who sampled "Mama Used to Say" on his single "Mama – Who Da Man" in June 2000.

Discography

Albums

Singles

References

External links
 Junior Giscombe's website
 

1957 births
Living people
English people of Jamaican descent
20th-century Black British male singers
People from Wandsworth
Singers from London
British contemporary R&B singers
Mercury Records artists
British male songwriters